spiritsEUROPE represents producers of spirits drinks at the EU level.

Structure
spiritsEUROPE represents the interests of the spirits sector from 31 national associations and 8 leading multinational companies.
 Bacardi-Martini
 Moët Hennessy
 Diageo
 Beam Suntory
 Davide Campari Milano
 Pernod Ricard
 Rémy Cointreau
 Brown-Forman

History and figures 
Brussels-based spiritsEUROPE was created in 2012 from the merger of the European Spirits Organisation - CEPS and The European Forum for Responsible Drinking (EFRD). The EU spirits industry represents over €26 billion in EU sales; 1 million jobs in production & sales; €21.4 billion of tax contribution and is the EU's largest agri-food exporter with €9.6 billion of exports.

Objectives 
spiritsEUROPE's goals include:
 	Promoting the responsible consumption of alcoholic beverages (through prevention campaigns, consumer information, etc.).
       Encouraging the industry to adopt high level standards for marketing self-regulation (Industry Guidelines, online training for marketing professionals)
	Securing appropriate legislative conditions at EU level for the production, marketing, distribution and sale of spirits within the EU (EU Internal Market; Spirits & Society)
	Ensuring that there is no discrimination between alcoholic beverages, including for taxation
	Creating better market access for EU spirits outside the EU (External Trade)
	Informing people about the economic contribution of the spirit industry to the EU (Industry Statistics, Ernst & Young data, Publications, Factsheets).

Alcohol abuse prevention 
In 2005, the Charter on Responsible Alcohol Consumption was adopted. The commitments included responsible drinking messages and codes of conduct on marketing of spirits drinks. EU spirits producers agreed to implement these commitments by the end of 2010.  In October 2010, building on the experience of the 2005 Charter, spiritsEUROPE's members adopted a new series of commitments.  The Road Map 2015: responsible drinking.eu included a new series of commitments on marketing self-regulation and promoting responsible drinking.  As with the Charter, annual progress reports on implementation were published annually, with the final one being published early 2016.

Prevention Campaigns in the EU  
The spirits industry is committed to work with relevant stakeholders at national level to help reduce alcohol-related harm. “Drinks initiatives” are targeted initiatives undertaken by the spirits sector across the EU aimed at reducing alcohol-related harm in six areas:
 Alcohol and minors: initiatives seek to discourage underage drinking by providing tools and supporting parents and teachers to engage with minors. 
 Drink-driving: initiatives aim to raise awareness of the dangers of drinking and driving.
 Responsible service/selling: initiatives aim to raise knowledge and skills of those working in bars and shops on not selling to/serving underage or intoxicated people. 
 Consumer information: initiatives promote responsible drinking to adult consumers. 
 Workplace: initiatives range from the adoption and implementation of an alcohol policy at the work place, to information and education campaigns for employees, or support schemes for those with alcohol-related problems.
 Non-commercial alcohol: initiatives to raise awareness of the negative consequences for personal health resulting from the consumption of non-commercial alcohol.
The details of the interventions can be accessed on the www.drinksinitiatives.eu  database.

Alcohol and Health Forum 
spiritsEUROPE, together with forty other stakeholders, was a founding member of the European Commission's Alcohol and Health Forum. The initiative was proposed by the European Commission as part of the EU strategy to support member states in reducing alcohol-related harm adopted in October 2006.

References

Distilleries
Organisations based in Brussels
Organizations established in 1993
Pan-European food industry trade groups
Trade associations based in Belgium